Eldon Floyd Lautermilch (born September 9, 1949) is a Canadian provincial politician. He was the Saskatchewan New Democratic Party member of the Legislative Assembly of Saskatchewan for the constituency of Prince Albert Northcote.

Life
He was first elected in 1986 and was re-elected in subsequent elections in 1991, 1995, 1999 and 2003.

He was appointed to the cabinet in 1992, and held several portfolios including  Energy and Mines, Rural Development, Economic and Co-operative Development, Minister of Intergovernmental Affairs, Minister of Aboriginal Affairs, Forestry, Minister of Highways and Transportation, and Government House Leader.

He won the 2003 election by more than 1600 votes.

Lautermilch did not run in the 2007 election.

References

Living people
Saskatchewan New Democratic Party MLAs
1949 births
21st-century Canadian politicians
People from Lafleche, Saskatchewan